Tillich is a German (and West Slavic) surname. It may refer to:

 Ernst Tillich (1910–1985), German theologian
 Paul Tillich (1886–1965), German-American Protestant theologian
 Paul Tillich Park, New Harmony, Indiana, USA
 Stanislaw Tillich (born 1959), Sorbian German politician, Minister-President of Saxony
 Johannes Tillich (1780–1807), a German teacher inventor of Tillich bricks for maths and science teaching.

German-language surnames